Crotaphopeltis tornieri, also known commonly as Tornier's cat snake and Werner's cat snake, is a species of snake in the family Colubridae. The species is endemic to Africa.

Etymology
The specific name, tornieri, is in honor of German zoologist Gustav Tornier.

Geographic range
C. tornieri is found in Malawi, Tanzania and Kenya.

Habitat

Reproduction
C. tornieri is oviparous.

References

Further reading
Rasmussen JB (1993). "The current taxonomic status of Tornier's cat-snake (Crotaphopeltis tornieri)". Amphibia-Reptilia 14: 395–409.
 Finke, Florian & Daniel Liepack (2021). A first record of the Tornier's Cat Snake (Crotaphopeltis tornieri [Werner, 1908]) from Kenya. Erstnachweis der Torniers Katzennatter (Crotaphopeltis tornieri [Werner, 1908]) in Kenia. Sauria 43 (2): 67-70
https://sauria.de/freepdf/Sauria2021_2_67-70.pdf

Spawls, Stephen; Howell, Kim; Hinkel, Harald; Menegon, Michele (2018). Field Guide to East African Reptiles, Second Edition. London: Bloomsbury Natural History. 624 pp. . (Crotaphopeltis tornieri, p. 526).
Werner F (1908). "Ergebnisse der mit Subvention aus der Erbschaft Treitl unternommenen zoologischen Forschungreise Dr. Franz Werner's nach dem ägyptischen Sudan und Nord-Uganda. XII. Die Reptilien und Amphibien ". Sitzungsberichte der Kaiserlichen Akademie der Wissenschaften, Mathematisch-Wissenschaftliche Klasse 116: 1823–1926. (Leptodira tornieri, new species, p. 1876). (in German).

Reptiles described in 1908
Reptiles of Malawi
Reptiles of Tanzania
Colubrids